The V-2 No. 13 was a modified V-2 rocket that became the first object to take a photograph of the Earth from outer space.

Flight 

The famous photograph was taken with an attached DeVry 35 mm black-and-white motion picture camera.  The flight was an addition to the  Hermes program  which had been ongoing since 1944. Rocket V-2 No.13 was assembled and launched by General Electric company with both captured German components and re-manufactured ones.

See also 

 Astrophotography
 Timeline of first images of Earth from space

References

Rocket launches in 1946
Astrophotography
Spaceflight before 1951
1946 in New Mexico
October 1946 events
October 1946 events in the United States